Pope Leo XIII (r. 1878–1903) created 147 cardinals in 27 consistories held at roughly annual intervals. With his appointments he approached but did not exceed the limit on the size of the College of Cardinals set at 70 in 1586. The size of the college was 64 at the beginning and end of Leo XIII's 25-year papacy. With 147 additions to a body of fewer than 70, Leo had, as one observer phrased it, "renewed the Sacred College more than twice".

The largest group of fourteen new cardinals, with two more kept secret, was announced on 16 January 1893. Nine of Leo's cardinals were created in pectore and only announced at a later consistory. Those announced at his first consistory included his brother Giuseppe Pecci. In 1893, he elevated to cardinal Giuseppe Sarto, who succeeded him as Pope Pius X in 1903. The cardinals he created included brothers Serafino and Vincenzo Vannutelli in 1887 and 1889 and cousins Luigi Jacobini and Angelo Jacobini in 1879 and 1882. Another of Leo's cardinals, von Fürstenberg, had a cousin in the College appointed in 1842 by Pope Gregory XVI.

Of the 147 cardinals Pope Leo created, 85 were Italian. Only three were not Europeans: Gibbons (United States), Moran (Australia), and Taschereau (Canada). 
Pope Leo's appointments also included the first Australian, Moran, the first Canadian, Taschereau, the first Slovenian, Missia, and the first Armenian, Hassoun, who was also the first prelate of an Oriental rite made a cardinal since 1439. Cardinals who died before visiting Rome to be assigned their titular churches included Guilbert, Lluch, and Rotelli.

Of the 147 cardinals Leo appointed, 63 survived him and 61 of them, along with one cardinal appointed earlier, participated in the 1903 conclave that elected Pius X.

12 May 1879

After waiting more than a year, on 12 May 1879, Pope Leo created cardinals for the first time, six of the order of cardinal priests and four of the order of cardinal deacons, including among the latter his brother, Giuseppe Pecci. On 22 September he gave red galeros to three of them (Desprez, Haynald, and Pie), as well as to János Simor, whom Pope Pius IX had made a cardinal in 1873. Von Fürstenberg joined his cousin Friedrich Prince zu Schwarzenberg, a cardinal since 1842.
 Friedrich Egon von Fürstenberg (1813–1892)
 Julien-Florian-Félix Desprez (1807–1895)
 Lajos Haynald (1816–1891)
 Louis-Édouard-François-Desiré Pie (1815–1880)
 Americo Ferreira dos Santos Silva (1829–1899)
 Gaetano Alimonda (1818–1891)
 Giuseppe Pecci (1807–1890)
 John Henry Newman (1801–1890)
 Joseph Hergenröther (1824–1890)
 Tommaso Maria Zigliara (1833–1893)

19 September 1879
 Pope Leo created four cardinals on 19 September 1879.
 Pier Francesco Meglia (1810–1883)
 Giacomo Cattani (1823–1887)
 Luigi Jacobini (1832–1887)
 Domenico Sanguigni (1809–1882)

13 December 1880
Pope Leo announced the creation of one cardinal on 13 December 1880, reserving the names of three others in pectore. Hassoun was the first Armenian cardinal and first Oriental-rite cardinal since 1439. Ricci Paracciani's cousin Salvatore Nobili Vitelleschi was made a cardinal in 1875, just five months before he died.
 Andon Bedros Hassoun (1809–1884)
 Carlo Laurenzi (1821–1893), in pectore, announced 1884
 Francesco Ricci Paracciani (1830–1894), in pectore, announced March 1882
 Pietro Lasagni (1814–1885), in pectore, announced March 1882

27 March 1882

On 27 March 1882, Pope Leo announced the names of two cardinals he had created in pectore in December 1880 and created another five, revealing the names of all but one (Lavigerie). Angelo Jacobini joined his cousin Luigi, then Secretary of State, who was made a cardinal in 1879.
 Domenico Agostini (1825–1891)
 Charles Lavigerie (1825–1892), in pectore, announced on 3 July 1882
 Joaquín Lluch y Garriga (1816–1882)
 Edward MacCabe (1816–1885)
 Angelo Jacobini (1825–1886)

25 September 1882
Pope Leo announced the creation of two cardinals on 25 September 1882.
 Angelo Bianchi (1817–1897)
 Włodzimierz Czacki (1834–1888)

24 March 1884
Pope Leo created two cardinals on 24 March 1884.
 José Sebastião de Almeida Neto (1841–1920)
 Guglielmo Sanfelice d'Acquavella (1834–1897)

10 November 1884
On 10 November 1884, Pope Leo announced the creation of eight cardinals and announced the name of one, Carlo Laurenzi, made a cardinal in pectore in December 1880.
 Michelangelo Celesia (1814–1904)
 Antolín Monescillo y Viso (1811–1897)
 Guglielmo Massaia (1809–1889)
 Cölestin Josef Ganglbauer (1817–1889)
 Zeferino González y Díaz Tuñón (1831–1894)
 Carmine Gori-Merosi (1810–1886)
 Ignazio Masotti (1817–1888)
 Isidoro Verga (1832–1899)

27 July 1885

On 27 July 1885, Pope Leo created five cardinals of the order of cardinal priests and one cardinal deacon (Cristofori).
 Paul Melchers (1813–1895)
 Alfonso Capecelatro (1824–1912)
 Francesco Battaglini (1823–1892)
 Patrick Francis Moran (1830–1911)
 Placido Maria Schiaffino (1829–1889)
 Carlo Cristofori (1813–1891)

7 June 1886

Pope Leo created seven cardinals on 7 June 1886. The two cardinal deacons Pope Leo created on 7 June 1886, Theodoli and Mazzella, were assigned their deaconries on 10 June; the other five cardinal priests were given their titular churches on 17 March 1887.
 Victor-Félix Bernadou (1816–1891)
 Elzéar-Alexandre Taschereau (1820–1898)
 Benoit-Marie Langénieux (1824–1905)
 James Gibbons (1834–1921)
 Charles-Philippe Place (1814–1893)
 Augusto Theodoli (1819–1892)
 Camillo Mazzella (1833–1900)

14 March 1887

Pope Leo created five cardinals, all cardinal priests, on 14 March 1887.
 Serafino Vannutelli (1834–1915)
 Gaetano Aloisi Masella (1826–1902)
 Luigi Giordani (1822–1893)
 Camillo Siciliano di Rende (1847–1897)
 Mariano Rampolla (1843–1913)

23 May 1887
Pope Leo created two cardinal deacons on 23 May 1887. Bausa was not yet a bishop and was only consecrated in March 1889. Pallotti was never consecrated a bishop.
 Luigi Pallotti (1829–1890)
 Agostino Bausa (1821–1899)

11 February 1889
Pope Leo announced the creation of three cardinals on 11 February 1889.
 Giuseppe Benedetto Dusmet (1818–1894)
 Giuseppe d'Annibale (1815–1892)
 Luigi Macchi (1832–1907)

24 May 1889

Pope Leo created seven cardinals on 24 May 1889. Guilbert died less than three months later without having visited Rome to be assigned his titular church.

 François-Marie-Benjamin Richard (1819–1908)
 Joseph-Alfred Foulon (1823–1893)
 Aimé-Victor-François Guilbert (1812–1889)
 Pierre-Lambert Goossens (1827–1906)
 Franziskus von Paula Graf von Schönborn (1844–1899)
 Achille Apolloni (1823–1893)
 Gaetano de Ruggiero (1816–1896)

30 December 1889
On 30 December 1889, Pope Leo created a single cardinal without making it known. His brother Serafino was already a cardinal.
 Vincenzo Vannutelli (1836–1930) in pectore, announced 1890

23 June 1890

Pope Leo created three cardinals of the order of cardinal priests on 23 June 1890 and announced he had created Vincenzo Vannutelli a cardinal in pectore the previous December.
 Sebastiano Galeati (1822–1901)
 Gaspard Mermillod (1824–1892)
 Albin Dunajewski (1817–1894)

1 June 1891
Pope Leo created two cardinals on 1 June 1891. Rotelli received his red hat from French President Sadi Carnot, but died before being invested by the pope with the other symbols of his new rank.
 Luigi Rotelli (1833–1891)
 Anton Josef Gruscha (1820–1911)

14 December 1891
Pope Leo created two cardinals of the order of cardinal priests on 14 December 1891.
 Fulco Luigi Ruffo-Scilla (1840–1895)
 Luigi Sepiacci (1835–1893)

16 January 1893

Pope Leo created fourteen cardinals publicly on 16 January 1893 and two others in pectore.
 Giuseppe Guarino (1827–1897)
 Mario Mocenni (1823–1904)
 Amilcare Malagola (1840–1895)
 Angelo Di Pietro (1828–1914)
 Benito Sanz y Forés (1828–1895)
 Guillaume-René Meignan (1817–1896)
 Léon-Benoît-Charles Thomas (1826–1894)
 Philipp Krementz (1819–1899)
 Ignatius Persico (1823–1896)
 Luigi Galimberti (1835–1896)
 Michael Logue (1840–1924)
 Kolos Ferenc Vaszary (1832–1915)
 Herbert Vaughan (1832–1903)
 Georg von Kopp (1837–1914)
 Adolphe Perraud (1828–1906) in pectore, announced 1895
 Andreas Steinhuber (1824–1907) in pectore, announced 1894

12 June 1893
Pope Leo created five cardinals in a consistory held on 12 June 1893, including Giuseppe Sarto, his successor as Pope Pius X.
 Victor-Lucien-Sulpice Lécot (1831–1908)
 Giuseppe Maria Graniello (1834–1896)
 Joseph-Christian-Ernest Bourret (1827–1896)
 Lőrinc Schlauch (1824–1902)
 Giuseppe Sarto (1835–1914)

18 May 1894

Pope Leo created five cardinals in May 1894, four cardinal priests and one cardinal deacon (Segna). He announced that he had made Andreas Steinhuber a cardinal in pectore previously.
 Egidio Mauri (1828–1896)
 Ciriaco María Sancha y Hervás (1833–1909)
 Domenico Svampa (1851–1907)
 Andrea Carlo Ferrari (1850–1921)
 Francesco Segna (1836–1911)

29 November 1895

Pope Leo created eight cardinals on 29 November 1895 and announced that he had made Adolphe Perraud a cardinal in pectore in 1893. Francesco Satolli, Apostolic Delegate to the United States, did not travel to Rome for the ceremony, but received his insignia of office from Cardinal James Gibbons, Archbishop of Baltimore, on 5 January 1896.
 Sylvester Sembratovych (1836–1898)
 Francesco Satolli (1839–1910)
 Johannes Evangelist Haller (1825–1900)
 Antonio María Cascajares y Azara (1834–1901)
 Girolamo Maria Gotti (1834–1916)
 Jean-Pierre Boyer (1829–1896)
 Achille Manara (1827–1906)
 Salvador Casañas y Pagés (1834–1908)

22 June 1896
Pope Leo created four cardinals of the order of cardinal priests on 22 June 1896.
 Domenico Jacobini (1837–1900)
 Antonio Agliardi (1832–1915)
 Domenico Ferrata (1847–1914)
 Serafino Cretoni (1833–1909)

30 November 1896
Two cardinals were created on 30 November 1896; they received their red galeros on 3 December. Neither was a bishop when made cardinal; Prisco was consecrated in 1898.
 Raffaele Pierotti (1836–1905)
 Giuseppe Antonio Ermenegildo Prisco (1833–1923)

19 April 1897
Pope Leo created four cardinals on 19 April 1897.
 José María Martín de Herrera y de la Iglesia (1835–1922)
 Pierre-Hector Coullié (1829–1912)
 Guillaume-Marie-Joseph Labouré (1841–1906)
 Guillaume-Marie-Romain Sourrieu (1825–1899)

19 June 1899

Pope Leo announced the creation of 11 new cardinals on 19 June 1899 and created two in pectore, Alessandro Sanminiatelli Zabarella and Francesco Salesio Della Volpe, whose names were published in 1901. Missia was the first Slovenian to enter the College of Cardinals.
 Giovanni Battista Casali del Drago (1838–1908)
 Francesco di Paola Cassetta (1841–1919)
 Alessandro Sanminiatelli Zabarella (1840–1910) in pectore, announced April 1901
 Gennaro Portanova (1845–1908)
 Giuseppe Francica-Nava de Bontifè (1846–1928)
 Agostino Ciasca (1835–1902)
 François-Désiré Mathieu (1839–1908)
 Pietro Respighi (1843–1913)
 Agostino Richelmy (1850–1923)
 Jakob Missia (1838–1902)
 Luigi Trombetta (1820–1900)
 Francesco Salesio Della Volpe (1844–1916) in pectore, announced April 1901
 José Calassanç Vives y Tuto (1854–1913)

15 April 1901

Pope Leo created ten cardinals on 15 April 1901, assigning eight to the order of cardinal priests and two to the order of cardinal deacons (Tripepi and Cavagnis).
 Donato Maria Dell'Olio (1847–1902)
 Sebastiano Martinelli (1848–1918)
 Casimiro Gennari (1839–1914)
 Lev Skrbenský z Hříště (1863–1938)
 Giulio Boschi (1838–1920)
 Agostino Gaetano Riboldi (1839–1902)
 Jan Puzyna de Kosielsko (1842–1911)
 Bartolomeo Bacilieri (1842–1923)
 Luigi Tripepi (1836–1906)
 Felice Cavagnis (1841–1906)

22 June 1903

At his last consistory held less than a month before his death, Pope Leo created seven cardinals and assigned them all to the order of cardinal priests. Only Nocella, Cavicchioni, and Fischer were present to receive their red hats from the pope and be assigned their titular sees on 25 June. The others participated in the conclave that elected Pope Pius X and it was from him that Herrero received his red galero and titular church assignment on 27 August, as did Aiuti, Taliani, and Karschthaler theirs on 12 November 1903.
 Carlo Nocella (1826–1908)
 Beniamino Cavicchioni (1836–1911)
 Andrea Aiuti (1849–1905)
 Emidio Taliani (1838–1907)
 Sebastián Herrero y Espinosa de los Monteros (1822–1903)
 Johannes Katschthaler (1832–1914)
 Anton Hubert Fischer (1840–1912)

Notes

References

External links

Leo XIII
19th-century Catholicism
20th-century Catholicism
College of Cardinals